Carlo Borea (born 24 March 1954) is an Italian retired professional tennis player who won two medals at the 1975 Mediterranean Games.

References

External links

Italian male tennis players
Mediterranean Games gold medalists for Italy
Mediterranean Games bronze medalists for Italy
Competitors at the 1975 Mediterranean Games
Mediterranean Games medalists in tennis
Living people
1954 births
20th-century Italian people